Parashorea lucida (also called white meranti) is a species of plant in the family Dipterocarpaceae. The name lucida is derived from Latin (lucidus = clear) and refers to the venation on the leaf. It is a tall emergent tree, up to 60 m tall, found in mixed dipterocarp forest on clay and clay soils. It is found in Sumatra and Borneo. It is threatened by habitat loss.

References

lucida
Critically endangered plants
Trees of Sumatra
Trees of Borneo
Flora of Sarawak
Taxonomy articles created by Polbot